The cherry casebearer moth (Coleophora pruniella) is a moth of the family Coleophoridae. It is found in North America, including New York, Oklahoma, Utah, Ontario and British Columbia.

The wingspan is about 11 mm.

The larvae feed on the leaves of Prunus, Rosa, Amelanchier, Betula, Alnus, Juglans, Myrica, Comptonia, Salix, Populus and Fraxinus species. They create a composite leaf case. The silken case is tubular at first. Young larvae overwinter in this case. In spring, the case is attached to a larger, irregularly oval section formed by cutting out a portion of the mine, and the early section is discarded.

References

pruniella
Moths of North America
Moths described in 1861